Takenaka may refer to:

Takenaka Corporation, Japanese architecture and construction company

People with the surname
, Japanese economist and former Minister of Internal Affairs and Communications
, better known as Char, Japanese musician
, Japanese artistic gymnast
, Japanese long-distance runner

Takenaka Shigeharu, Japanese samurai

People with the given name
, Japanese diplomat

Japanese-language surnames
Japanese masculine given names